Ranganayaki  is a 2019 Indian Kannada drama film written and directed by Dayal Padmanabhan. The film was produced by S. V. Narayan under his banner S.V. Entertainment. It features Aditi Prabhudeva and MG Srinivas along with Trivikram Srinivas, who is making his debut in the lead roles. The supporting cast includes Lasya Nagraj, Suchendra Prasad and Chakravthy Chandrachud. The score and soundtrack for the film is by Manikanth Kadri and the cinematography is by Rakesh B. The editing of the film was done by Sunil Kashyap H. N. The film before getting released was selected to the Panorama Section of the 50th International Film Festival of India (IFFI), and is the only Kannada film that has been selected.

Production and release 
The film was announced on 28 March 2019. The principal photography of the film began on 26 April 2019. The film features Aditi Prabhudeva as the lead along with MG Srinivas and Trivikram Srinivas. Manikanth Kadri scored the film. The film was selected for the Panorama Section of 50th International Film Festival of India (IFFI). The film was released on November 1, 2019 on account of Kannada Rajyotsava.

Awards and nominations
Ranganayaki is the only Kannada film to make it to the 50th edition of the International Film Festival of India (IFFI) in the year 2019.

Cast 

 Aditi Prabhudeva as Ranganayaki
 MG Srinivas as Krishna
 Trivikram Srinivas as Madhav
 Lasya Nagraj
 Suchendra Prasad
 Chakravarthy Chandrachud
 Sundar Raj

Soundtrack 

The film's background score and the soundtracks were composed by Manikanth Kadri. The music rights were acquired by Ananda Audio.

References

External links 

 

2010s Kannada-language films
Indian drama films
2019 drama films
2019 films
Films shot in Mysore
Films shot in Bangalore